The Naughty Nineties is a 1945 American film starring the comedy team of Abbott and Costello. The film is noteworthy for containing a filmed version of the duo's famous "Who's on First?" routine. This version is shown at the National Baseball Hall of Fame and Museum in Cooperstown, New York.

Plot
The time is the 1890s. Captain Sam, owner of the showboat River Queen, travels along the Mississippi River bringing honest entertainment to each town.  At a stop in Ironville, he meets Crawford, Bonita, and Bailey, who are wanted by the local sheriff.  Against the advice of his daughter Caroline, his lead actor Dexter Broadhurst, and his chief roustabout Sebastian Dinwiddle, the Captain joins them for a card game at a local gambling house.

The Captain is plied with alcohol until he is intoxicated and gets involved in a crooked card game where he loses controlling interest in the show boat to Bonita and Crawford.  They turn the showboat into a floating gambling casino with every game rigged in their favor. Dexter and Sebastian help the captain regain ownership of his vessel and oust the unwanted criminals.

Cast
Bud Abbott as Dexter Broadhurst
Lou Costello as Sebastian Dinwiddle
Alan Curtis as Crawford
Rita Johnson as Bonita Farrow
Henry Travers as Capt. Sam Jackson
Lois Collier as Miss Caroline Jackson
Joe Sawyer	as Bailey
Joe Kirk as Croupier
Lillian Yarbo as Bonita's cook (uncredited)

Routines

Who's on First?
The line, "Who's on First?", was ranked No. 91 on American Film Institute's 100 Movie Quotes.
The "Who's on First?" scene was intended to appear much earlier in the film. Costello begins the routine by saying, "When we get to St. Louis...", but at this point in the film they are already in St. Louis.
Members of the film's  crew can be heard laughing off camera during the routine.

Other routines
The film also contains the "Lower/Higher" routine, where Costello auditions as a singer while Abbott shouts directions to the stage crew to change the height and placement of the backdrop curtain.  Costello believes Abbott is directing him, not the stagehands, and follows Abbott's instructions by singing higher or lower, or even on one foot.

Bonita sneaks poison into Lou's wine, leading to the old swapping of glasses routine (previously done by Abbott & Costello in Pardon My Sarong).

Costello accidentally bakes feathers into a cake, which is served to everyone in the saloon.  The patrons wind up coughing up a blizzard of feathers. This gag was taken from the Three Stooges short Uncivil Warriors (1935).

Costello and Sawyer perform the "Mirror Scene," copying each other's actions. Variations of this old vaudeville routine were done by several movie comedians, most famously in the 1933 Marx Brothers film Duck Soup. Abbott and Costello had used it before, too, in Lost in a Harem.

To break up the crooked card game and rescue Captain Sam, Abbott concocts a plan to dress as a bear and scare everyone out of the casino. Costello ends up wrestling with a real bear, thinking that he's wrestling Abbott in a bear suit.

Production
Filming occurred from January 15, 1945 through March 1, 1945.
On May 13, 1945, during filming of their next film, Abbott and Costello in Hollywood for MGM Pictures, Abbott and Costello returned to Universal for re-shoots on this film.
The riverboat used was originally constructed for the 1936 Universal musical Show Boat.

Rerelease
It was re-released in 1950 along with One Night in the Tropics, which also contained a shorter version of the "Who's on First?" routine.

Home media
This film has been released three times on DVD.  The first time, on The Best of Abbott and Costello Volume Two, on May 4, 2004, and again on October 28, 2008 as part of Abbott and Costello: The Complete Universal Pictures Collection. In November 2019, Abbott and Costello: The Complete Universal Pictures Collection was rereleased on DVD and Blu-ray as an 80th anniversary edition.

References

External links

1945 films
1940s historical films
American historical films
Abbott and Costello films
American black-and-white films
Films directed by Jean Yarbrough
Films set in the 1890s
Films set on ships
Films about gambling
Universal Pictures films
Films scored by Paul Dessau
1940s English-language films
1940s American films